Lycodonomorphus is a genus of snakes commonly referred to as African water snakes. They are small, nonvenomous snakes, with all members being endemic to Africa, especially Tanzania.

Species
The following nine species are recognized as being valid.
Lycodonomorphus bicolor   — Tanganyika white-bellied water snake
Lycodonomorphus inornatus  — Olive house snake, Olive ground snake
Lycodonomorphus laevissimus  — Dusky-bellied water snake
Lycodonomorphus leleupi  — Congo dark-bellied water snake, Mulanje water snake
Lycodonomorphus mlanjensis  — Mlanje white-bellied water snake
Lycodonomorphus obscuriventris  — Floodplain water snake
Lycodonomorphus rufulus  — Common brown water snake
Lycodonomorphus subtaeniatus  — Eastern Congo white-bellied water snake, Lined water snake
Lycodonomorphus whytii  — Whyte's water snake

Nota bene: A binomial authority in parentheses indicates that the species was originally described in a genus other than Lycodonomorphus.

Etymology
The specific name, whytii, is in honor of British naturalist Alexander Whyte (1834–1908), who worked in Nyasaland (now Malawi) from 1891 to 1897.

References

External links
 Scale counts of Lycodonomorphus members. 
"Lycodonomorphus ".  NCBI Taxonomy Browser.

Further reading
Auerbach RD (1987). The Amphibians and Reptiles of Botswana. Botswana: Mokwepa Consultants. 295 pp.
Boulenger GA (1893). Catalogue of the Snakes in the British Museum (Natural History). Volume I. London: Trustees of the British Museum. (Taylor and Francis, printers). 448 pp.
Boycott RC (1992). An Annotated Checklist of the Amphibians and Reptiles of Swaziland. The Conservation Trust of Swaziland, 1992; online at https://web.archive.org/web/20120914175238/http://www.sntc.org.sz/checklst/sdreptam.html.
Broadley DG (1967). "A review of the genus Lycodonomorphus Fitzinger (Serpentes: Colubridae) in southeastern Africa, with a key to the genus". Arnoldia 3 (16): 1-9.
Broadley DG, Cotterill FPD (2004). "The reptiles of southeast Katanga, an overlooked 'hot spot' ". African Journal of Herpetology 53 (1): 35-61.
Fitzinger L (1843). Systema Reptilium, fasciculus primus, Amblyglossae. Vienna: Braumüller et Seidel. 106 pp. (in Latin).
Fitzinger L (1826). Neue Classification der Reptilien nach ihren natürlichen Verwandtschaften nebst einer Verwandschafts-Tafel und einem Verzeichnisse der Reptilien-Sammlung des K. K. Zoologischen Museums zu Wien. Vienna: J. G. Heubner. 66 pp. (in German and Latin).
Haagner GV (1992). "Life History Notes - Lycodonomorphus rufulus ". Journal of the Herpetological Association of Africa (41): 42.
Lichtenstein MHC (1823). Verzeichniss der Doubletten des zoologischen Museums der Königl. Universität zu Berlin nebst Beschreibung vieler bisher unbekannter Arten von Säugethieren, Vögeln, Amphibien und Fischen. Berlin: Königl. Preuss. Akad. Wiss./ T. Trautwein. x + 118 pp. (in German).
Marais J (2004). A Complete Guide to the Snakes of Southern Africa, Second Edition. Struik Publishers. 312 pp.
Raw LRG (1973). "A review of the dusky-bellied water snake, Lycodonomorphus laevissimus (Günther), with descriptions of two new subspecies". Annals of the Natal Museum 21 (3): 713-718. (Lycodonomorphus laevissimus fitzsimonsi nov. subsp., Lycodonomorphus laevissimus laevissimus nov. subsp., Lycodonomorphus laevissimus natalensis nov. subsp.) 

Lamprophiidae
Reptiles of Uganda
Reptiles of Tanzania
Snake genera
Taxa named by Hinrich Lichtenstein